The women's duet event at the 2004 Summer Olympics in Athens, Greece, took place inside the Athens Olympic Aquatic Centre from 23 to 25 August. Reigning world champions Anastasia Davydova and Anastasia Ermakova of Russia overwhelmed the audience with an extraordinarily synchronous and impressive performance to defend their Olympic title with a final merit of 99.334 points. Japan's Miya Tachibana and Miho Takeda maintained a silver-medal streak in their second Olympics with 98.417, while U.S.A. duo Anna Kozlova and Alison Bartosik climbed out from behind to earn a bronze with 96.918.

The preliminary phase consisted of a technical routine and a free routine. The scores from the two routines were added together and the top 12 duets qualified for the final.

The final consisted of one free routine, the score from the final free routine was added to the score from the preliminary technical routine to decide the overall winners.

Schedule 
All times are Greece Standard Time (UTC+2)

Results

Qualification

Final

References

External links
 Official Olympic Report

Duet
2004 in women's sport
Women's events at the 2004 Summer Olympics